Christopher Adam Leroux (born April 14, 1984) is a Canadian former professional baseball pitcher and television personality. He played for the Florida Marlins, Pittsburgh Pirates, and New York Yankees in Major League Baseball (MLB) and for the Tokyo Yakult Swallows of Nippon Professional Baseball (NPB). Leroux also competed for the Canadian national baseball team in international competitions.

Career

Amateur career
Leroux attended St. Joseph Secondary School in Mississauga, Ontario. The Tampa Bay Devil Rays selected Leroux in the ninth round in the 2002 MLB draft, but he did not sign. He attended Winthrop University, where he played college baseball for the Winthrop Eagles baseball team. He also played collegiate summer baseball for the Falmouth Commodores of the Cape Cod League in 2004.

Professional career

Minor leagues
The Florida Marlins selected Leroux in the seventh round of the 2005 MLB draft, and he signed. In 2006, Leroux was assigned to the Greensboro Grasshoppers of the Class A South Atlantic League, where he made three starts before being injured. After a rehab assignment with the Gulf Coast Marlins of the Rookie-level Gulf Coast League, he was assigned to the Jamestown Jammers of the Class A-Short Season New York-Penn League. In 11 total starts, he went 0-4 with a 6.06 earned run average (ERA), striking out 22 in  innings pitched. Leroux played 2007 with Greensboro, where in 46 appearances, he went 2-3 with a 4.14 ERA, striking out 76 in  innings.

Leroux played 2008 with the Jupiter Hammerheads of the Class A-Advanced Florida State League, where in 57 games, he went 6-7 with a 3.65 ERA and one save, striking out 78 in 74 innings. Leroux began 2009 with the Jacksonville Suns of the Class AA Southern League, where he played until he was promoted to the major leagues by the Marlins. He had a few stints with Florida, but spent most of his time in Jacksonville, where in 46 games, he went 5-3 with a 2.70 ERA and two saves, striking out 55 in 60 innings.

Florida Marlins
On May 23, 2009, Leroux was recalled by the Marlins. He made his MLB debut three days later against the Philadelphia Phillies. He was optioned the next day when Brett Carroll was recalled. He rejoined the Marlins when Matt Lindstrom went on the disabled list. In his third appearance, he recorded his first MLB strikeout, which was of Cristian Guzmán. In 5 games with the Marlins, he had a 10.80 ERA with two strikeouts in  innings

Leroux opened 2010 with the New Orleans Zephyrs of the Class AAA Pacific Coast League (PCL), but was recalled on April 14. Leroux was placed on the 15-day disabled list on May 19 with a right elbow strain. He missed 26 games, and was subsequently assigned to New Orleans. He was recalled on September 3 when the rosters expanded.

Pittsburgh Pirates
Leroux was claimed off waivers by the Pittsburgh Pirates on September 13, 2010. In 23 games with both teams, he went 0-1 with a 6.75 ERA with 22 strikeouts in  innings.

Leroux began 2011 with the Indianapolis Indians of the Class AAA International League, but after a poor start, he was demoted to the Altoona Curve of the Class AA Eastern League. After a 5-game stint with Altoona, he returned to Indianapolis. On July 3, Leroux was recalled to Pittsburgh, replacing Brad Lincoln. He was optioned to Indianapolis on July 22, but was recalled 5 days later, only to be placed on the disabled list with a left calf strain 2 days after that. He was activated from the disabled list on August 22, and remained on the roster for the rest of the season. In 23 games with the Pirates, he went 1–1 with a 2.88 ERA.

Prior to the 2012 season, Leroux was placed on the 60-day DL with a right pectoral strain. He rejoined the club as a September call-up after rehab and an assignment to the AAA Indianapolis Indians. In 10 games with the Pirates, he had a 5.56 ERA with 12 strikeouts in 11.2 innings.

Leroux made the 2013 Opening Day roster with the Pirates, but was designated for assignment on April 12 after pitching in 2 games. He elected free agency on April 17, 2013.

Tokyo Yakult Swallows

On April 23, 2013, Leroux signed with the Tokyo Yakult Swallows of the Central League of Nippon Professional Baseball.

New York Yankees
On January 27, 2014, Leroux signed a minor league contract with the New York Yankees.  The deal included an invitation to major league spring training.  Leroux began the season with the Scranton/Wilkes-Barre RailRiders of the International League. He made his Yankee debut on April 29, 2014. He was designated for assignment on May 3, 2014. He was called back up by the Yankees on July 23, 2014, but was designated for assignment two days later. He was called back up a third time on August 11, 2014 and again designated for assignment two days later. After the 2014 season, he became a free agent. After pitching two innings, he earned a 22.50 ERA, a loss, and didn't earn a win.

Later career
Leroux signed a minor league deal with the Milwaukee Brewers on January 26, 2015. He began the season with the Colorado Springs Sky Sox of the PCL. On May 18, 2015, he was traded to the Philadelphia Phillies for cash considerations. He spent the rest of the season with the Reading Fightin Phils of the Eastern League and the Lehigh Valley IronPigs of the International League.

On April 3, 2016, Leroux was traded to the Toronto Blue Jays for cash considerations, and assigned to the Buffalo Bisons of the International League. He was released on August 28.

After playing for the Canadian national team in the 2017 World Baseball Classic, Leroux retired from baseball.

International career
He was selected to the Canada national baseball team at the 2009 World Baseball Classic, 2013 World Baseball Classic, 2015 Pan American Games, 2015 WBSC Premier12, 2017 World Baseball Classic, 2019 Pan American Games Qualifier, 2019 Pan American Games and 2019 WBSC Premier12.

Pitching style
Leroux throws three pitches: a four-seam fastball and two-seam fastball in the low-to-mid 90s, and a slider in the low-to-mid 80s. He also used to throw a changeup to left-handed hitters, but he dropped it after the 2011 season to simplify his pitching approach.

Personal life
In 2017, Leroux was cast as the Bachelor on The Bachelor Canada.

References

External links

1984 births
Living people
Altoona Curve players
Bachelor Nation contestants
Baseball people from Quebec
Baseball players at the 2015 Pan American Games
Baseball players at the 2019 Pan American Games
Bradenton Marauders players
Canadian expatriate baseball players in Japan
Canadian expatriate baseball players in the United States
Canadian people of French descent
Colorado Springs Sky Sox players
Falmouth Commodores players
Florida Marlins players
Greensboro Grasshoppers players
Gulf Coast Marlins players
Gulf Coast Yankees players
Indianapolis Indians players
Jacksonville Suns players
Jamestown Jammers players
Jupiter Hammerheads players
Major League Baseball pitchers
Major League Baseball players from Canada
Navegantes del Magallanes players
Canadian expatriate baseball players in Venezuela
New York Yankees players
New Orleans Zephyrs players
Nippon Professional Baseball pitchers
Pan American Games gold medalists for Canada
Pan American Games silver medalists for Canada
Pan American Games medalists in baseball
Pittsburgh Pirates players
Scranton/Wilkes-Barre RailRiders players
Baseball players from Montreal
Tokyo Yakult Swallows players
Toros del Este players
Canadian expatriate baseball players in the Dominican Republic
Winthrop Eagles baseball players
World Baseball Classic players of Canada
2009 World Baseball Classic players
2013 World Baseball Classic players
2015 WBSC Premier12 players
2017 World Baseball Classic players
2019 WBSC Premier12 players
Medalists at the 2015 Pan American Games
Medalists at the 2019 Pan American Games